A mantrap, security mantrap portal, airlock, sally port or access control vestibule is a physical security access control system comprising a small space with two sets of interlocking doors, such that the first set of doors must close before the second set opens. Airlocks have a very similar design, allowing free ingress and egress while also restricting airflow.

In a manual mantrap, a guard locks and unlocks each door in sequence. An intercom and/or video camera are often used to allow the guard to control the trap from a remote location.

In an automatic mantrap, identification may be required for each door, sometimes even different measures for each door. For example, a key may open the first door, but a personal identification number entered on a number pad opens the second.  Other methods of opening doors include proximity cards or biometric devices such as fingerprint readers or iris recognition scans. Time of Flight sensors are used in high security environments.

Metal detectors are often built in to prevent the entrance of people carrying weapons. This use is particularly frequent in banks and jewelry shops.

Turnkey, installed systems are provided by some suppliers due to need for technically trained installers.

Fire codes require that automatic mantraps allow exit from the intermediate space while denying access to a secure space such as a data center or research lab. A manually-operated mantrap may allow a guard to lock both doors, trapping a suspect between the doors for questioning or detainment.

See also 
 Mantrap (snare)
 Sally port
 Optical turnstile

References

External links
 

Perimeter security